Eulophota is a genus of snout moths. It was described by George Hampson in 1926.

Species
 Eulophota bipars de Joannis, 1927
 Eulophota caustella (Hampson in Ragonot, 1901)
 Eulophota floridella de Joannis, 1927
 Eulophota pretoriella de Joannis, 1927
 Eulophota simplex de Joannis, 1927
 Eulophota zonata Hampson, 1926

References

Phycitinae